The Saint-Cyr House is a town house in Brussels, Belgium. It was built by the architect Gustave Strauven, between 1901 and 1903, in Art Nouveau style. It is Strauven's most important building, and served as a private residence for the painter and decorator .

The house is situated at 11, / in the Squares Quarter (eastern part of the City of Brussels). It is served by the bus stop Ambiorix (on lines 56, 60, 63 and 64).

History
The Saint-Cyr House was designed and built by the architect Gustave Strauven, who began his career as an assistant designer working with Victor Horta. It was built to serve as a private residence for the painter and decorator . Work began in February 1901 and the house was declared complete by the City of Brussels in July 1903.

Always coveted by architecture enthusiasts, the building, listed as a historic monument on 8 August 1988, has had several owners. In 1909, the Leurs family, a pawnbroker, bought it from the painter. The dancer Chamie Lee acquired it in the 1950s and transformed the ground floor into a dance hall for her classes. An antique dealer from Etterbeek became the owner in 2003 to resell it in 2006 to the Antwerp agency Movast, specialising in historic buildings. The house had been in a poor state of repair, but as of March 2013, has been restored to its former splendour by the Brussels architect Francis Metzger, from the MA² office.

Description
The facade, marked by a flamboyant Art Nouveau style, is entirely covered by polychrome bricks and has a good deal of wrought iron, which is adorned with geometric motifs and ornate balustrades at each floor. The wrought iron mimics vegetation and the decorative elements occupy all the space available. Due to its extravagance, the building has been called Art Nouveau-Baroque. The interior is characterised by different styles, varying according to the rooms.

See also

 Art Nouveau in Brussels
 History of Brussels
 Belgium in "the long nineteenth century"

References

Footnotes

Notes

Bibliography
 

Houses in Belgium
City of Brussels
Art Nouveau architecture in Brussels
Art Nouveau houses
Houses completed in 1903
1903 establishments in Belgium